Michael D. Intriligator (February 5, 1938 – June 23, 2014) was an American economist at the University of California, Los Angeles, where he was Professor of Economics, Political Science, and Policy Studies, and Co-Director of the Jacob Marschak Interdisciplinary Colloquium on Mathematics in the Behavioral Sciences. In addition, he was a Senior Fellow at the Milken Institute in Santa Monica, a Senior Fellow of the Gorbachev Foundation of North America in Boston, a Foreign Member of the Russian Academy of Science, and a Fellow of the American Association for the Advancement of Science. He received his Ph.D. in Economics at MIT in 1963 and the same year joined the UCLA Department of Economics. He taught courses in economic theory, econometrics, mathematical economics, international relations, and health economics, and received several distinguished teaching awards.

His research interests were mathematical economic theory; applications of quantitative economics to strategy and arms control; health economics; and the future of the Russian economy. His most significant academic collaborations were with economists such as Kenneth Arrow, Dagobert Brito, and Zvi Griliches.  His influential 1971 book, "Mathematical Optimization and Economic Theory" brought previously inaccessible mathematical techniques into the mainstream of the field.

Intriligator is regarded as an important figure in peace economics. He served on the Research Committee of the Institute for Economics and Peace from 2009 until his death, and held leadership roles in Economists for Peace and Security. He served on the United States Institute of Peace International Network for Economics and Conflict.

Intriligator was co-founder and co-editor of the Handbooks in Economics series He was active in public policy debates, making many policy recommendations, especially for economic and national security policy.

He was married for more than 50 years to Devrie Intriligator, a space physicist.  He fathered four sons: Kenneth, James, William, Robert.

Selected bibliography 
Books
 

Journal articles

References 

1938 births
2014 deaths
20th-century American economists
International relations scholars
University of California, Los Angeles alumni
MIT School of Humanities, Arts, and Social Sciences alumni
Fellows of the Econometric Society
Foreign Members of the Russian Academy of Sciences